Neyestan (also Romanized as Neyestān; also known as Unisun and Ūnīūn) is a village in Kahshang Rural District, in the Central District of Birjand County, South Khorasan Province, Iran. At the 2016 census, its population was 65, in 22 families.

References 

Populated places in Birjand County